Ausonia (minor planet designation: 63 Ausonia) is a stony Vestian asteroid from the inner region of the asteroid belt, approximately 100 kilometers (60 miles) in diameter. It was discovered by Italian astronomer Annibale de Gasparis on 10 February 1861, from the Astronomical Observatory of Capodimonte, in Naples, Italy. The initial choice of name for the asteroid was "Italia", after Italy, but this was modified to Ausonia, an ancient classical name for the Italian region.

Orbit and classification 

Ausonia is a member of the Vesta family. Vestian asteroids have a composition akin to cumulate eucrites (HED meteorites) and are thought to have originated deep within 4 Vesta's crust, possibly from the Rheasilvia crater, a large impact crater on its southern hemisphere near the South pole, formed as a result of a subcatastrophic collision. Vesta is the main belt's second-largest and second-most-massive body after Ceres.

It orbits the Sun in the inner asteroid belt at a distance of 2.1–2.7 AU once every 3 years and 9 months (1,354 days; semi-major axis of 2.40 AU). Its orbit has an eccentricity of 0.13 and an inclination of 6° with respect to the ecliptic.

Physical characteristics 

In the Tholen classification, Ausonia is a stony S-type asteroid, while in the SMASS classification, it is an Sa-subtype, that transitions from the S-type to the uncommon A-type asteroid. The body's stony composition has also been confirmed by polarimetric observations in 2017. Based on its lightcurve, a small moon had been suggested but never confirmed.

According to the surveys carried out by the Infrared Astronomical Satellite IRAS, the Japanese Akari satellite and the NEOWISE mission of NASA's Wide-field Infrared Survey Explorer, Ausonia measures between 87.47 and 116.044 kilometers in diameter  and its surface has an albedo between 0.125 and 0.25. The Collaborative Asteroid Lightcurve Link derives an albedo of 0.2082 and a diameter of 90 kilometers based on an absolute magnitude of 7.55.

Ausonia was in a study using the Hubble FGS. Other studied asteroids included 15 Eunomia, 43 Ariadne, 44 Nysa, and 624 Hektor. In 1976, Ausonia was the subject of a photometric study by the Observatory of Turin in Italy. A lightcurve of Ausonia was obtained with the ESO 0.5-metre telescope at La Silla Observatory in 1980.

References

External links 
 Asteroid Lightcurve Database (LCDB), query form (info )
 Dictionary of Minor Planet Names, Google books
 Asteroids and comets rotation curves, CdR – Observatoire de Genève, Raoul Behrend
 Discovery Circumstances: Numbered Minor Planets (1)-(5000) – Minor Planet Center
 
 

000063

000063
000063
Discoveries by Annibale de Gasparis
Named minor planets
18610210